Transfiguration Cathedral is a Russian Orthodox church in Berdsk of Novosibirsk Oblast, Russia. Architect: Pyotr Chernobrovtsev. The cathedral is located 10 kilometers south of Novosibirsk.

History
The church constructed in 1992–2001.

Graves
Archimandrite Macarius (Remorov) and the first Bishop of Novosibirsk and Berdsk Sergius (Sokolov) are buried near the cathedral.

References

Churches in Siberia
Russian Orthodox Church in Russia
Churches in Novosibirsk Oblast
Berdsk